Christopher Gerard Smith (born May 17, 1970) is an American former professional basketball player who was a point guard.

Basketball career
Born in Bridgeport, Connecticut, Smith played collegiately at the University of Connecticut. He left the Huskies after scoring 2,145 points in his four years, an all-time record (this included another record, 1,140 points in Big East Conference history), and also led the team in career three-point field goals with 242, being one of only two UConn players to score at least 500 points in three different seasons.

A member of the UConn Basketball All Century Team, Smith was also nominated for the John Wooden Award, was named a McDonald's All American and was a member of an All-Big East first team. He played for the US national team in the 1990 FIBA World Championship, winning the bronze medal.

Smith was selected in the second round (34th overall) of the 1992 NBA Draft by the Minnesota Timberwolves. He played three seasons (224 total games) with the team, averaging 5.1 points, 2.8 assists, 1.3 rebounds and .5 steals per game.

He continued to play for various franchises in the Continental Basketball Association and Europe until 2000, when a series of injuries transitioned his career to sales and financial services. He received a B.A. in business administration, going on to work as a business development officer for both the People's Bank and its insurance subsidiary, Beardsley, Brown & Bassett.

Personal
Smith son, Christopher Smith Jr. is now the assistant coach of Indiana Wesleyan University. 
Smith is cousin of another basketball player, and point guard, Mario Chalmers, who also played in the National Basketball Association, notably with the Miami Heat.

References

External links
 
 Basketpedya career data

1970 births
Living people
20th-century African-American sportspeople
21st-century African-American sportspeople
1990 FIBA World Championship players
African-American basketball players
American expatriate basketball people in Belgium
American expatriate basketball people in France
American expatriate basketball people in Israel
American expatriate basketball people in Spain
American men's basketball players
Basketball players from Connecticut
Competitors at the 1990 Goodwill Games
Fort Wayne Fury players
Goodwill Games medalists in basketball
Grand Rapids Hoops players
La Crosse Bobcats players
Liga ACB players
Limoges CSP players
Minnesota Timberwolves draft picks
Minnesota Timberwolves players
Parade High School All-Americans (boys' basketball)
Point guards
Rockford Lightning players
Shooting guards
Sioux Falls Skyforce (CBA) players
Sportspeople from Bridgeport, Connecticut
UConn Huskies men's basketball players
United States men's national basketball team players